Sander Cornelis count Schimmelpenninck (born June 26, 1984) is a Dutch opinion writer, commentator and television presenter. From 2016 to September 2020, he was the editor-in-chief of the magazine Quote. Since September 2019, he has been a columnist for the newspaper de Volkskrant. Along with his college friend Jaap Reesema and Titus van Dijk, he co-founded the production company Tonny Media, which produces podcasts including the Zelfspodcast.

Early life and education 
Schimmelpenninck comes from the noble branch of the Schimmelpenninck family and is the son of the former steward of Twickel Castle, Albert Hieronymus Schimmelpenninck, and radiologist Marie Liesbeth Henriëtte Helène Scheiffers. He grew up in Diepenheim and attended the Bataafs Lyceum in Hengelo, and obtained his gymnasium diploma from the Staring College in Lochem. He then studied law at Erasmus University in Rotterdam, where he was a member of the Rotterdam Student Corps, and at Bocconi University in Milan.

Career 
After finishing his studies, Schimmelpenninck worked for three years as a trainee lawyer at the Houthoff Buruma law firm on the Zuidas in Amsterdam. He then started a pizza restaurant called Pink Flamingo in Amsterdam with his college friend Jaap Reesema.

In 2013, Schimmelpenninck started working as an editor at the business magazine Quote. In 2016, he succeeded Mirjam van den Broeke as editor-in-chief. After more than three years, he announced his departure to focus on new projects.

Since 2019, he has been a columnist for the newspaper de Volkskrant.

In addition, in 2019, Schimmelpenninck started a podcast called the Zelfspodcast together with Reesema, in which they discuss their daily lives based on different topics per episode. On October 6, 2020, they won the award for best podcast at the Online Radio Awards.

At the end of 2020, he, along with Reesema and Titus van Dijk, founded the media company Tonny Media, which primarily produces podcasts, including Geuze & Gorgels and Marc-Marie & Aaf vinden iets since January 2021.

Television

WNL (2018–2020) 
The first television program that Schimmelpenninck made was De Opvolgers for WNL in 2018. In that year, he was the winner of the TV quiz De Slimste Mens. From January 9, 2020, until the end of August of that year, he presented the NPO talk show Op1 on Thursday evenings with Welmoed Sijtsma. He was succeeded by Jort Kelder. Before and after that, he was a regular guest on talk shows such as Beau, De Wereld Draait Door, and Jinek.

In addition to his work on Op1, Schimmelpenninck made a season of Dragons' Den on NPO 1 from April 2020, in which aspiring entrepreneurs pitch their own businesses to a group of investors. Jort Kelder was also his successor here.

VPRO (2020–present) 
Together with Thomas Erdbrink, Northern Europe correspondent for The New York Times, Schimmelpenninck made a one-time special in 2020 about the Swedish approach to the Coronavirus pandemic: Zweden doen het anders (Sweden does it differently). In 2021, Schimmelpenninck developed the program Sander en de Kloof (Sander and the Divide), which aired on television in 2022.  The program was nominated for a Televizierring award in the 'Impact' category.

Filmography

Bibliography 

 2019: Elite gezocht; Prometheus - with Ruben van Zwieten.
 2023: Sander en de brug: Vijf voorstellen voor een eerlijker Nederland; De Correspondent.

References

External links 

 Interview at  Tims ^ tent: maar dan in een bungalow (VPRO) (2018)
 Interview at EenVandaag (AVROTROS) (2019)
 Interview at De Avondshow met Arjen Lubach (VPRO) (2022)
 Twitter profile

1984 births
Living people
Dutch journalists
Dutch columnists
Dutch television presenters
Dutch television talk show hosts
Dutch writers